"Burning Bridges" is a song from Pink Floyd's 1972 album Obscured by Clouds. It shares a similar tune to the instrumental "Mudmen" on the same album.

Composition and vocals
It consists of an organ melody written by Richard Wright, with David Gilmour and Wright singing the lyrics by Roger Waters as a duet.

Live performances 

The song was performed live by Mason in 2022, with his band Nick Mason's Saucerful of Secrets.

Personnel
David Gilmour – electric guitar, slide guitar, lead vocals
Richard Wright – Hammond organ, lead vocals
Roger Waters – bass guitar
Nick Mason – drums, percussion

References

External links

Pink Floyd songs
1972 songs
Songs written by Richard Wright (musician)
Songs written by Roger Waters
Song recordings produced by David Gilmour
Song recordings produced by Roger Waters
Song recordings produced by Richard Wright (musician)
Song recordings produced by Nick Mason
Songs of the Vietnam War